Pura Lempuyang Luhur is one of the oldest and the most revered temple in Bali, Indonesia. The temple is actually a collection of several temples along the hiking path to the summit. The main temple also the highest, the Pura Lempuyang Luhur, lies at 1,175m above sea level, up on the peak of the namesake Mount Lempuyang.

The temple is located on Mount Lempuyang or Gamongan Hill, Bunutan village, Abang subdistrict, Karangasem, east Bali, around 10 kilometres north from Amlapura, the capital of Karangasem. The temple complex is dedicated to Ida Betara Hyang Iswara, the guardian of the east. It is one of Sad Kahyangan Jagad or the "six sanctuaries of the world" which are the six holiest places of worship on Bali.

The most popular temple among visitors is the Pura Penataran Agung Lempuyang. With its towering white candi bentar split gate, three dragon stairs and three kori agung gates, this compound has views to the west overlooking Mount Agung, the highest volcano in Bali.

Temples
The temple consists of several temples along the hiking path to the summit of Mount Lempuyang or also known as Gamongan Hill in eastern Bali. The temples along the hiking track among others areː
 Pura Penataran Lempuyang
 Pura Telaga Mas
 Pura Telaga Sawangan
 Pura Lempuyang Madya
 Pura Puncak Bisbis
 Pura Pasar Agung
 Pura Lempuyang Luhur

See also

 Hinduism in Indonesia
 Pura Ulun Danu Bratan
 Besakih

References

External links
 

Lempuyang
Hindu temples in Indonesia
Cultural Properties of Indonesia in Bali